TAVAJ Linhas Aéreas was a Brazilian airline founded in 1994 and based in Manaus, Brazil. It operated an extensive network in the Northern and Central-West regions of Brazil. It ceased operations in 2004.

History 

The airline traces its origins to an air taxi company Taxi Aéreo Vale do Juruá, established in Cruzeiro do Sul in September 1972. In March 1994 it was transformed into a regional scheduled operator, changed its name to TAVAJ Transportes Aéreos Regulares S/A, and moved its base to Rio Branco. In 2002 TAVAJ moved its base again, this time to Manaus. It ceased its operations in 2004.

Initially it was a direct competitor of TABA – Transportes Aéreos da Bacia Amazônica and flew with a fleet of 5 Embraer EMB 110 Bandeirante. In 1995 TAVAJ added further 2 EMB110 Bandeirante and the first Fokker F27 MK600. In 1997, as a project of major expansion, TAVAJ leased 4 Bombardier Dash 8-200B directly from the manufacturer but only 2 were delivered.

In 1999 TAVAJ suffered a hard blow during the currency exchange devaluation crisis. Because of high leasing and insurance costs, the airline was forced to return the 2 Dash 8-200B. Continuous economic difficulties lead TAVAJ to cease passenger operations in 2004.

Destinations 
In 1998 TAVAJ was operating flights to 31 cities in the states of Acre, Amazonas, Goiás, Mato Grosso, Pará, and Rondônia.

Fleet

See also
List of defunct airlines of Brazil

References

External links
 TAVAJ Accidents as per Aviation Safety Database

Defunct airlines of Brazil
Airlines established in 1994
Airlines disestablished in 2004
1994 establishments in Brazil